Duck Lake State Park is a public recreation area covering  along Lake Michigan  southwest of Whitehall in Muskegon County, Michigan. The state park, which runs along the north side of Duck Lake to Lake Michigan, features a large sand dune. The park's Scenic Drive is part of the Shoreline Trail route in Muskegon County.

History
The land was purchased by the Nature Conservancy from two Boy Scout organizations and acquired by the state in 1974. The park officially opened in 1988.

Facilities and activities 
A beach at the mouth of Duck Lake is a popular spot for swimming and fishing. A half-mile paved trail skirts Duck lake.
The park also offers picnicking, boat launch, snowmobiling, cross-country skiing, and hunting.

See also
List of lakes in Michigan

References

External links
Duck Lake State Park Michigan Department of Natural Resources
Duck Lake State Park Map Michigan Department of Natural Resources

State parks of Michigan
Protected areas of Muskegon County, Michigan
Protected areas established in 1974
1974 establishments in Michigan
IUCN Category III
Beaches of Michigan
Landforms of Muskegon County, Michigan
Lakes of Michigan
Lakes of Muskegon County, Michigan